The Xiaohu FEV (FEV stands for Family Electric Vehicle), also known as the Mullen I-Go, is an electric city car produced by Henan Henrey Shiying Vehicle.

Overview
Mullen Technologies unveiled a rebadged version in October 2022, which includes a 16.5 kWh battery pack that provides  of range in the New European Driving Cycle.

In 2022, the Xiaohu FEV received an update, gaining more autonomy.

Powertrain

References

Cars introduced in 2021
Electric cars
Production electric cars
Cars of China
City cars
Rear-wheel-drive vehicles
Microcars
Hatchbacks
Rear-engined vehicles